The Manhattans is the seventh studio album by American vocal group, The Manhattans, released in 1976 through Columbia Records. This album has been Certified Gold by the R.I.A.A.

Reception
The album peaked at No. 6 on the R&B albums chart. It also reached No. 16 on the Billboard 200. The album features the singles "Kiss and Say Goodbye", which peaked at No. 1 on the Hot Soul Singles chart and the Billboard Hot 100, and "Hurt", which reached No. 10 on the Hot Soul Singles chart and No. 97 on the Billboard Hot 100.

Track listing

Charts 
Album

Singles

References

External links
 

1976 albums
The Manhattans albums
Albums produced by Bobby Martin
Albums recorded at Sigma Sound Studios
Columbia Records albums